Brachycentrus is a genus of humpless casemaker caddisflies in the family Brachycentridae. There are at least 30 described species in Brachycentrus.

Species
These 30 species belong to the genus Brachycentrus:

 Brachycentrus adoxus McLachlan, 1880
 Brachycentrus americanus (Banks, 1899)
 Brachycentrus appalachia Flint, 1984
 Brachycentrus bilobatus Martynov, 1935
 Brachycentrus carpathicus Dziedzielewicz, 1895
 Brachycentrus chelatus Ross, 1947
 Brachycentrus cinerea Walker, 1852
 Brachycentrus echo (Ross, 1947)
 Brachycentrus etowahensis Wallace, 1971
 Brachycentrus fuliginosus Walker, 1852
 Brachycentrus incanus Hagen, 1861
 Brachycentrus japonica (Iwata, 1927)
 Brachycentrus kozlovi Martynov, 1909
 Brachycentrus kuwayamai Wiggins, Tani & Tanida, 1985
 Brachycentrus lateralis (Say, 1823)
 Brachycentrus maculatum (Fourcroy, 1785)
 Brachycentrus montanus Klapalek, 1892
 Brachycentrus nigrosoma (Banks, 1905)
 Brachycentrus numerosus (Say, 1823)
 Brachycentrus occidentalis Banks, 1911
 Brachycentrus punctatus Forsslund, 1935
 Brachycentrus schnitnikovi Martynov, 1924
 Brachycentrus signata (Fabricius, 1781)
 Brachycentrus solomoni Flint, 1984
 Brachycentrus spinae Ross, 1948
 Brachycentrus subnubilis Curtis, 1834
 Brachycentrus subnubilus Curtis, 1834
 Brachycentrus tazingolensis Mey, 1980
 Brachycentrus ugamicus Grigorenko & Ivanov, 1990
 † Hydronautia labialis (Hagen, 1856)

References

Further reading

External links

 

Trichoptera genera
Trichoptera
Articles created by Qbugbot